Mesosa tonkinea is a species of beetle in the family Cerambycidae. It was described by Stephan von Breuning in 1939. It is known from Vietnam and Laos.

References

tonkinea
Beetles described in 1939